The Muslim Halwai are a Muslim community found in various parts of India and Pakistan, mainly in Uttar Pradesh. They have their ancestral backgrounds from Arabian tribes. Halwai caste, > Halva means sweets in Hindi and Halvai or Halwai are sweet makers. Their preferred self-designation is Shaikh. They are also known as Mohammadi Halwai, Faridi, Adnani, Siddiqui.

History and origin

The Halwai are a community associated with the manufacture of sweetmeats. Their name comes from the Arabic word Halva, which means a sweetmeat. 

They have the following subdivision, the Purbi or eastern and Pachaon or western group, and speak Urdu, as well as local dialects of Hindi. These sub-divisions are further divided into clans, known as biradaris, which claim descent from a common ancestor. Important biradaris include the Tobacco Traders, The biscuit Traders and the Sweet Makers but Halwai is common among them. Marriages are preferred within the biradari, and only rarely will take place outside the community.

Present circumstances
The Halwai are a Sunni Muslim community. They also visit the shrines of various Sufi saints found in North India, such as Khwaja Moinuddin Chishti.

They are a landless community, involved in the selling of sweetmeats, tobacco, and as well as the occupation of dyeing clothes. Members of the community members have taken up jobs in government and private service. They are largely an urban community, living in their residential quarters. Almost all older cities in North India and Pakistan have a Halwai Mohalla
The Muslim Halwai have their own registered committee with name of All India Muslim Halwai biradari committee to deal with matters relating to the community. Haji Mahmood Ahmad is a founder and President of all India Muslim halwai biradari committee.

See also
 Shaikhs in South Asia

References

Muslim communities of India
Social groups of Pakistan
Social groups of Uttar Pradesh
Social groups of Bihar
Shaikh clans
Muslim communities of Uttar Pradesh